Cyriel Omey (13 June 1897 – 28 June 1977) was a Belgian racing cyclist. He rode in the 1924 Tour de France.

References

1897 births
1977 deaths
Belgian male cyclists
Place of birth missing